The Handasaim Herzliya High School, formerly known as the Tel-Aviv University Secondary School is a high school located in Herzliya. The current principal of the school is Orit Rosen.

The school was established in the 1962, thanks to a donation given by the Meyerhoff family from Brazil, as a high school belonging to the Tel Aviv University.

Handasaim offers only science electives such as computer science and biotechnology and attracts students from all over the country due to its excellence.

In 2005, due to Tel Aviv University's financial difficulties the school was sold to the Herzliya municipality and in 2008 the school moved to a new campus in Herzliya located near the 'Seven Stars' Mall and very close to two other schools: high school Hadash, and middle school Yad Giyora.

The school is located next to a science center which was built especially for Handasaim, used by all high schools in Herzliya. The science center includes advanced labs for physics, chemistry, robotics etc., and is the biggest science center used by high school students in Israel.

The school supports programs such as FRC, FLL and Nachshon.
The school offers three courses: Computer Science, Engineering and Biotechnology.

Handasaim high school is the school with the most FIRST teams in Israel, and as of 2020, includes 12 FLL teams and an FTC team, all mentored by the members of the school's FRC team General Angels.
A new robotics building on campus is currently under construction and will be used by the school's flagship team, General Angels.

Handasaim is known to be the school from which the greatest number of soldier-students (atuda'im) graduates from all of the Israeli schools.

External links
The Handasaim Herzliya High School Website 

High schools in Israel
Educational institutions established in 1962
1962 establishments in Israel
Herzliya
Buildings and structures in Tel Aviv District